"No Surrender" is a song from Bruce Springsteen's album Born in the U.S.A.. It was only included on the album at the insistence of Steven Van Zandt, but has since become a concert staple for Springsteen. Though it was not one of the seven top ten hits of the album, "No Surrender" nevertheless charted on the Mainstream Rock chart, peaking at No. 29. It returned to prominence during the 2004 United States presidential election when John Kerry, the Democratic candidate and a fan of Springsteen, used the song as the main theme song for his campaign.

Live performances
During the Born in the U.S.A. Tour, Springsteen played a slower version of the song on acoustic guitar and harmonica. An August 6, 1984 recording at the Meadowlands Arena is included on the box set Live 1975–85.

The song was played occasionally in the Reunion Tour, The Rising Tour and later tours, including the Magic Tour and the River Tour. The song has been performed about 230 times through 2008.

On Springsteen's London Calling: Live in Hyde Park DVD, the song is performed with Brian Fallon of fellow New Jersey band The Gaslight Anthem.

Personnel
According to authors Philippe Margotin and Jean-Michel Guesdon:

Bruce Springsteen – vocals, guitars
Roy Bittan – piano
Danny Federici – organ
Garry Tallent – bass
Max Weinberg – drums
Richie Rosenberg – backing vocals, vocal harmonies

Cover versions
In 2008, Hot Water Music recorded the song on their B-sides and rarities album Til The Wheels Fall Off.

In 2009, Jill Johnson from Sweden recorded the song on the cover album Music Row II.

In 2009, Two Cow Garage recorded the song for the A side of Vol. 9 of Suburban Home Records' "Under the Influence" 7" covers series. Side B of the 7" features Jr. Juggernaut covering "Trouble" by Cat Stevens.

In 2010, Maeve O'Boyle recorded the song for her album Intermission which was released in 2011.

In 2013, Mark Salling recorded a cover of the song for the TV show Glee as a tribute to cast member Cory Monteith who died suddenly earlier in the year. His version of the song was featured in the season 5 episode "The Quarterback", a tribute to Monteith, and his character Finn Hudson, who had recently died.

In 2017, Australian country music singer James Blundell recorded the song as a duet with Paul Costa on his Campfire album

In 2017,  at the No Surrender Festival in Vilanova de Bellpuig, Catalonia, 1004 musicians and singers recorded a live version of the song.

Hawthorne Heights recorded a cover of the song on their 2019 album 'Lost Frequencies'

References

External links
 Lyrics & Audio clips from Brucespringsteen.net

Bruce Springsteen songs
1984 songs
Songs written by Bruce Springsteen
Song recordings produced by Jon Landau
Song recordings produced by Bruce Springsteen
Song recordings produced by Steven Van Zandt
Song recordings produced by Chuck Plotkin